David John Robinson (born 27 November 1969) is an English retired professional footballer.

A striker, Robinson began his career with his hometown club, Newcastle United, as an apprentice in 1986. In six years at St James' Park he made eight league and cup appearances, scoring against Reading in an FA cup replay.

After a loan spell with Peterborough United playing a vital role helping them to promotion in 1991, he joined Reading on a free transfer. He remained at Elm Park for just four months, after fellow Geordie Billy Ayre, then-manager at newly promoted Blackpool, came in for his services. He went on to make 26 league appearances for the Tangerines, scoring four goals.

Robinson returned to Tyneside in 1994 with Gateshead. After a year with the Heed, and a short spell with Bishop Auckland, he delved back into league football with Cambridge United.

In August 1996, two months after being released by Cambridge, Robinson joined Scottish club Berwick Rangers, where he brought his professional career to a close with four goals in as many games for the club.

His final club was Whitley Bay.

References

External links

1969 births
Living people
Footballers from Newcastle upon Tyne
English footballers
Newcastle United F.C. players
Peterborough United F.C. players
Reading F.C. players
Blackpool F.C. players
Gateshead F.C. players
Bishop Auckland F.C. players
Cambridge United F.C. players
Berwick Rangers F.C. players
Whitley Bay F.C. players
Wallsend Boys Club players
Association football midfielders